Zhao Shiyan (13 April 1901 - 19 July 1927) was a Chinese Communist martyr and former Chinese premier Li Peng's uncle.

Biography
Zhao was born in Youyang Zhou, Sichuan (now Youyang Tujia and Miao Autonomous County, Chongqing), on 13 April 1901, to Zhao Dengzhi. In 1915, Zhao went to Beijing to study at the High School Affiliated with Beijing Normal University and majored in English. In 1919, he participated in the May Fourth Movement, China Youth Association. The following year, he went to France to study, co-founded the Communist Party of China. In 1922, Zhao Shiyan and Ho Chi Minh were invited to join the French Communist Party. In 1922, he went to the Soviet Union and studied at the Communist University of the Toilers of the East. In 1923, he was appointed as CPC Party Committee Chairman in Beijing. In the same year in December, he was appointed as Chairman of the Northern Bureau of the CPC Central Committee.

In 1926, Zhao was sent to Shanghai with Zhou Enlai to lead the workers' armed uprising during the Northern Expedition. On 12 April 1927, Chiang Kai-shek launched a coup against his communist allies and massacred them in Shanghai. After Chen Yannian was arrested by Kuomintang, Zhao took over as secretary of CPC Jiangsu Provincial Committee. Zhao was arrested at his home on North Sichuan Road on 2 July because a renegade betrayed him.  He was executed in Shanghai on 19 July.

Works

Personal life
Zhao married Xia Zhixu, the couple had two sons, Zhao Shige and Zhao Lingchao.

Zhao's sister Zhao Juntao married Li Shuoxun. Their son, Li Peng served as China's premier from 1987 to 1998.

See also
 Historical Museum of French-Chinese Friendship

References

Bibliography

1901 births
1927 deaths
Chinese expatriates in the Soviet Union
Chinese Communist Party politicians from Chongqing
Republic of China politicians from Chongqing
Moscow Sun Yat-sen University alumni
Chinese expatriates in France
Tujia people
People murdered by organized crime
Members of the 5th Central Committee of the Chinese Communist Party